Kiciński (feminine: Kicińska, plural: Kicińscy) is a surname of Polish origin. It may refer to:

 Carol Kicinski, American food writer
 Michał Kiciński, Polish video game executive

See also
 

Polish-language surnames